
Gmina Przemyśl is a rural gmina (administrative district) in Przemyśl County, Subcarpathian Voivodeship, in south-eastern Poland, on the border with Ukraine. Its seat is the town of Przemyśl, although the town is not part of the territory of the gmina.

The gmina contains part of the protected area called Pogórze Przemyskie Landscape Park.

Villages
Gmina Przemyśl contains the villages and settlements of Bełwin, Hermanowice, Kuńkowce, Łętownia, Malhowice, Nehrybka, Ostrów, Pikulice, Rożubowice, Stanisławczyk and Witoszyńce.

Neighbouring gminas
Gmina Przemyśl is bordered by the city of Przemyśl and by the gminas of Fredropol, Krasiczyn, Krzywcza, Medyka and Żurawica. It also borders Ukraine.

References

Polish official population figures 2006

Przemysl
Przemyśl County